Borve is a village in Harris in the Outer Hebrides, Scotland.
Borve is also within the parish of Harris, and is on the A859.

References

External links

Canmore - Harris, Borve, Borve Lodge site record
Canmore - Harris, Borve, Borve House site record

Villages in Harris, Outer Hebrides